Walter Balmer may refer to:

 Billy Balmer (1875–1961), English footballer
 Walter Balmer (footballer)  (1948–2010), Swiss international footballer